Münsterplatz may refer to:
 Münsterplatz (Bern)
 Münsterplatz (Basel), a city square in Basel Minster

See also
 Münsterhof, a town square in Zürich